Conus aureus, common name the aureus cone, is a species of sea snail, a marine gastropod mollusk in the family Conidae, the cone snails and their allies.

Like all species within the genus Conus, these snails are predatory and venomous. They are capable of envenoming humans, therefore live ones should be handled carefully or not at all.

Subspecies
 Conus aureus paulucciae G. B. Sowerby III, 1887

Distribution
This marine species occurs off New Caledonia, Tuamotu, Indo-China, Indo-Malaysia and from Japan to Queensland, Australia.

Description
The size of the shell varies between 40 mm and 80 mm. The shell is subcylindrical, with fine revolving striae. It has an orange-brown color, very finely reticulated with chestnut, with larger subtriangular spots of white, aggregated into masses and bands at the shoulder, middle and base. There are usually a number of longitudinal streaks of chestnut running over the orange-brown reticulated spaces.

References

 Bruguière, M. 1792. Encyclopédie Méthodique ou par ordre de matières. Histoire naturelle des vers. Paris : Panckoucke Vol. 1 i–xviii, 757 pp.
 Lamarck, J.B.P.A. de M. 1810. Suite des espèces du genre Cône. Annales du Muséum National d'Histoire Naturelle. Paris 15: 263–286, 422–442
 Reeve, L.A. 1843. Monograph of the genus Conus. pls 1–39 in Reeve, L.A. (ed.). Conchologica Iconica. London : L. Reeve & Co. Vol. 1.
 Hinton, A. 1972. Shells of New Guinea and the Central Indo-Pacific. Milton : Jacaranda Press xviii 94 pp.
 Cernohorsky, W.O. 1978. Tropical Pacific marine shells. Sydney : Pacific Publications 352 pp., 68 pls.
 Röckel, D., Korn, W. & Kohn, A.J. 1995. Manual of the Living Conidae. Volume 1: Indo-Pacific Region. Wiesbaden : Hemmen 517 pp. 
 Tucker J.K. & Tenorio M.J. (2013) Illustrated catalog of the living cone shells. 517 pp. Wellington, Florida: MdM Publishing.
 Puillandre N., Duda T.F., Meyer C., Olivera B.M. & Bouchet P. (2015). One, four or 100 genera? A new classification of the cone snails. Journal of Molluscan Studies. 81: 1–23

External links
 The Conus Biodiversity website
 Cone Shells – Knights of the Sea
 

aureus
Gastropods described in 1792